The Panaad Park and Sports Complex(sometimes spelled Pana-ad), also known as the Panaad Park and Stadium or the  Panaad Sports and Recreational Park, is a sports and recreational park in Bacolod, Negros Occidental, Philippines owned by the Provincial Government of Negros Occidental. It also hosts a sports complex with a stadium. The park is known as the main venue of the Panaad Festival since its establishment in the late 1990s.

History
The park was established following the completion of a sports complex built for the hosting of the 1998 Palarong Pambansa, which includes the Panaad Stadium in Barangay Mansilingan of Bacolod. The area was then made as the primary venue of the Panaad Festival which was previously held at the Capitol Park and Lagoon from 1993 to 1996, and at Bredco Port in 1997.

Sports complex

Panaad Park hosts a sports complex with the Panaad Stadium as its main stadium. The sports complex also has a swimming pool complex with an Olympic-size swimming pool and a second pool for training purposes. It also hosts a softball diamond.

Flora
Eucalyptus is the primary type of tree which populates the park. It is estimated that there are 60,000 individual eucalyptus trees in the  park.

Other facilities

The venue has been the permanent venue of the Panaad Festival and hosts 32 pavilions which features the 32 towns and cities of Negros Occidental. The park hosts the extension office of Western Visayas chapter of the Maritime Industry Authority in a four-storey building inaugurated within the park in 2018. The 25-hectare Panaad Sports Complex, lined with eucalyptus trees and the 32 attractive pavilions for each local government unit. Each pavilion features the history, commerce, tourism, trade products and services, arts and culture, and food of the particular town or city.

The unfinished Negros First Animal Hub, a venue meant for trade of livestock and poultry and related-research and development to boost the agriculture of the province is also hosted inside the park. The center was left incomplete due to alleged anomalies in the bidding process.

References

Parks in the Philippines
Tourist attractions in Bacolod
Sports complexes in the Philippines